Yvonne Kelly (born c. 1935) is an Irish badminton player.

Biography
Yvonne Kelly is the daughter of badminton player Billy Kelly.

Kelly won her first titles at the Irish National Badminton Championships in 1956. She won the Irish Open for the first time two years later, and the Scottish Open in 1963. In total, she won 25 national titles and the Irish Open 10 times. She won mixed doubles with Cyril W. Wilkinson 7 times from 1962 to 1971.

She was coached by Frank Peard, along with fellow high ranking players including James 'Chick' Doyle and Mary Bryan. Until 2019, Bryan and Kelly held the record for the most Irish National Titles won as a pair in badminton.

Achievements

References

1930s births
Living people
Irish female badminton players